Middle Park (elev. ) is a high basin in the Rocky Mountains of north-central Colorado in the United States. It is located in Grand County, on the southwest slope of Rocky Mountain National Park, approximately 50 miles (80 km) west of (and across the continental divide from) Boulder.

Description

The basin surrounds the headwaters of the Colorado River on the west side of the Front Range.  It extends southwestward from the source of the Colorado at Grand Lake, downstream past Granby (the largest community), Hot Sulphur Springs, Parshall and Kremmling. It terminates on the western end roughly where the Colorado passes Gore Canyon at the southern end of the Gore Range. The valley also extends into the lower valleys of side tributaries on the upper Colorado such as the Fraser River, Williams Fork, and Willow Creek. The valley of the Fraser contains the towns of Fraser and Winter Park. The lower Blue River downstream of Dillon Reservoir is often included as part of Middle Park.

The valley receives its name from being the middle (and smallest) of the three large mountain valleys (i.e., parks) in Colorado on the western side of the Front Range. The other two are North Park and South Park. U.S. Highway 34 traverses the valley from the northeast to the southwest, and connects to U.S. Highway 40 at Granby.

The valley is surrounded on the north, east, and south by mountains that form the continental divide, and thus it forms a slight pocket eastward in the drainage basin of the Pacific Ocean in this part of the Rockies. North Park, to the north, is drained by the North Platte River and separated from the valley by relatively low passes, Muddy Pass and Willow Creek Pass. The passes on the east (Milner Pass) and south (Berthoud Pass), connect to the basin of the South Platte River. They are both in the Front Range proper and thus are higher and more likely to be snow-covered. Milner Pass is near the high point on Trail Ridge Road (U.S. Highway 34 in Rocky Mountain National Park) and is open only during summer months, allowing a seasonal connection by road between Estes Park and Grand Lake. Berthoud Pass, at the headwaters of the Fraser south of Winter Park, connects the valley via U.S. Highway 40 to Interstate 70 in Clear Creek Canyon. This latter route is the most direct route between the valley and Denver.

The valley contains several reservoirs on the Colorado and its tributaries, including Lake Granby, which inundates a large portion of the northeastern part of the valley. Unlike North Park and South Park, which are wide flat basins at the headwaters of the North and South Platte respectively, Middle Park is a narrower basin, allowing for less agricultural use as pasturelands. The main industry in the valley is tourism, including alpine skiing at Winter Park Ski Resort. Much traffic between Denver and the destination resort of Steamboat Springs passes through the valley as well, allowing for secondary tourism industries to proliferate in the smaller towns.  The smaller demand for water allows much of the water in the upper Colorado basin to be transported eastward across the continental divide to the Colorado Front Range as part of the Colorado-Big Thompson Project.

Valleys of Colorado
Landforms of Grand County, Colorado
Rocky Mountain National Park